Kyle Airport  is a registered aerodrome located  west of Kyle, Saskatchewan, Canada.

See also 
List of airports in Saskatchewan

References 

Registered aerodromes in Saskatchewan
Lacadena No. 228, Saskatchewan